Chen Yixin (born 1 September 1959) is a Chinese politician who is the current Minister of State Security and the secretary-general of the Central Political and Legal Affairs Commission of the Chinese Communist Party.

Early life and education 
Chen was born in Taishun County, Zhejiang. He graduated with a degree in physics from Lishui Teacher's College (now Lishui University), where he served as a leader in the school's Communist Youth League.

Political career 
He has served as deputy Secretary-General of Zhejiang Party Committee. In 2012 he became party secretary of Jinhua. On 3 January 2013, he became Communist Party Secretary of Wenzhou, a post which he served until 1 December 2015. Between December 2014 and December 2015, Chen was also a member of the Zhejiang Communist Party Standing Committee. 

Chen later became the deputy director of the Office of the Central Leading Group for Comprehensively Deepening Reforms in 2015 until 2016. On 26 June 2017, Chen was appointed as the Communist Party Secretary of Wuhan, a position he held until 20 March 2018, as well as deputy party secretary of Hubei.

In March 2018, Chen Yixin succeeded Wang Yongqing as the Secretary-General of the Central Political and Legal Affairs Commission.

In 2020, Chen was announced to be leading efforts related to the 2019-20 coronavirus epidemic.

References

1959 births
Living people
People's Republic of China politicians from Zhejiang
Chinese Communist Party politicians from Zhejiang
Politicians from Wenzhou
Alternate members of the 19th Central Committee of the Chinese Communist Party
Members of the 20th Central Committee of the Chinese Communist Party